Jean Veillet may refer to:

 Jean Veillet (1664–1741), French and Canadian ancestor of all the Veillet/te(s) of America
 Jean Veillet (1901–1985), French doctor part of the French Resistance in WWII, mayor of Dijon, and president of the general council of Côte-d'Or, France

See also
Veillette (disambiguation)